Isaac Whitbeck Van Schaick (December 7, 1817August 22, 1901) was an American businessman and Republican politician.  He served two terms in the  U.S. House of Representatives, representing Milwaukee County, Wisconsin.  He also served six years in the Wisconsin State Senate and two years in the State Assembly.  His nephew, Aaron Van Schaick Cochrane, was also a member of congress.

Early life
Van Schaick was born in Coxsackie, New York, on December 7, 1817.  He was educated in the common schools there and worked on his father's farm.  He engaged in the manufacture of glue in New York. He moved to Chicago in 1857, and to Milwaukee, Wisconsin, in 1861, where he was in the flour-milling business with his wife's family.  After the American Civil War, Van Schaick traveled to Arkansas and worked for in the cotton industry.  He returned to Milwaukee three years later.

Politics
Van Schaick was elected to the Milwaukee Common Council in 1871. He served as member of the Wisconsin State Assembly in 1873 and 1875. He served in the Wisconsin State Senate from 1877 to 1882.

Van Schaick was elected as a Republican to the Forty-ninth Congress in 1884 as the representative of Wisconsin's 4th congressional district. He declined to be a candidate for renomination in 1886, and was succeeded by Henry Smith of the Union Labor Party.

Van Schaick defeated Smith for election to the 51st United States Congress in 1888, receiving 22,212 votes to 20,685 for Smith (running on the Democratic and Labor tickets), 527 for Socialist John Schuler and 302 for Prohibitionist George Heckendorn. He was not a candidate for renomination to Congress in 1890, and was succeeded by Democrat John Lendrum Mitchell. In 1892 he ran unsuccessfully for State Senator from the 4th district, losing to Democrat James W. Murphy.

Late life
He moved to Catonsville, Maryland, in 1894, where he lived in retirement until his death there August 22, 1901. He was interred in Athens Cemetery, Athens, New York.

Personal life and family
Isaac Van Schaick married Eliza Sanderson, daughter of John Sanderson and Margaret Whitfield, in 1842, in Athens, New York.  She survived him, but died two years later, in 1903.

Electoral history

Wisconsin Assembly (1872, 1874)

Wisconsin Senate (1876, 1878, 1880)

U.S. House of Representatives (1884)

U.S. House of Representatives (1888)

Wisconsin Senate (1892)

References

External links

1817 births
1901 deaths
American people of Dutch descent
Wisconsin city council members
Wisconsin state senators
Members of the Wisconsin State Assembly
People from Coxsackie, New York
Maryland Republicans
Republican Party members of the United States House of Representatives from Wisconsin
People from Catonsville, Maryland
19th-century American politicians